is a 2009 Japanese documentary film by Japanese activist Tamaki Matsuoka about the Nanjing Massacre. On March 28, 2010 it was shown at the Hong Kong International Film Festival. It includes interviews with Japanese veterans who admit to raping and killing Chinese civilians, and accounts by Chinese survivors.

See also
Nanking massacre
Japanese war crimes
Japanese Devils

References

2009 films
2000s Japanese-language films
2009 documentary films
Documentary films about Japanese war crimes
Nanjing Massacre films
Japanese documentary films
2000s Japanese films